The 132nd (Highland) Regiment of Foot was a Scottish infantry regiment of the British Army, created in 1794 and disbanded in 1796. The regiment was raised by Duncan Cameron of Cullart, and did not see any active service; it served solely to recruit soldiers. On disbandment, the recruits were drafted into the Black Watch.

References

External links

Infantry regiments of the British Army
Scottish regiments
Military units and formations established in 1794
Military units and formations disestablished in 1796
1794 establishments in Great Britain
1796 disestablishments in Great Britain
1794 establishments in Scotland
1796 disestablishments in Scotland